Olga Laiuk (born ; 17 May 1984) is a Ukrainian handballer player for Kastamonu Bld. GSK and the Ukrainian national team.

She played for HC Spartak Kyiv (2001–2007) and HC Motor Zaporizhzhia (2007–2009) in her country before she moved to Spain to join BM Parc Sagunt. In 2011, she transferred to the Turkish team Muratpaşa Bld. SK, where she played 2015. Currently, she plays for Kastamonu Bld. GSK.

References

1984 births
Living people
Ukrainian female handball players
Sportspeople from Kyiv
Expatriate handball players in Turkey
Yenimahalle Bld. SK (women's handball) players
Ukrainian expatriate sportspeople in Turkey
Muratpaşa Bld. SK (women's handball) players